Jean-Claude Julien Léon Tronville, more commonly known as Jean-Claude Baker (April 18, 1943 – January 15, 2015) was a French-American restaurateur.

Biography
He was born Jean-Claude Julien Leon Tronville in 1943 in Dijon to Lucien Rouzaud and Constance Luce Tronville, who were not married when he was born, though they married later. At age 14, he struck out on his own, first to Paris where, as a bellhop in the Hôtel Scribe, he met Josephine Baker, an entertainer, activist, and wartime French Resistance agent.

Baker became the legal guardian of Jean-Claude, and he was then an unofficial addition to the 12 adopted children of her orphan "rainbow tribe", which included Jean-Claude Bouillon-Baker.  He, in turn, took her surname, and as a budding showman of his own, fostered her career.

Baker ran a popular nightclub, Pimm's Cafe, in West Berlin during the 1960s, and in 1986 opened the Cafe Josephine in New York. 

In 1993, he co-authored, with Chris Chase, a biography of Josephine Baker, Josephine: The Hungry Heart, described as a "shocking look into the star's seriously whitewashed past".

Death
Baker committed suicide at his home in East Hampton, New York, on January 15, 2015, at age 71.

Books
 Baker, Jean-Claude & Chris Chase. Josephine: The Hungry Heart (2001), Cooper Square Pub;

References

1943 births
2015 deaths
American restaurateurs
French emigrants to the United States
People from Dijon
American biographers
Place of birth missing
American male biographers
Bisexual men
Suicides in New York (state)
20th-century American businesspeople
2015 suicides